The Aruba Billie Jean King Cup team represents Aruba in Billie Jean King Cup tennis competition and are governed by the Aruba Lawn Tennis Bond. They currently compete in the Americas Zone of Group II.

History
Aruba competed in its first Billie Jean King Cup in 2022. Their best result was finishing third in their Group II pool in 2022.

Players

Recent performances
Here is the list of all match-ups of the Aruba participation in the Billie Jean King Cup in 2022.

See also
Billie Jean King Cup
Aruba Davis Cup team

References

External links

Billie Jean King Cup teams
Billie Jean King Cup
Billie Jean King Cup